The list of ship decommissionings in 1927 includes a chronological list of all ships decommissioned in 1927.


July

14 July 

 T-3:  Ex-AA-3; decommissioned and sold for scrap

November

10 November 

 Geranium: Arabis-class sloop

References

1927
 
Ship